Donnie Ray Davis (September 18, 1940 – January 19, 2004) was an American football wide receiver in the National Football League for the Dallas Cowboys and Houston Oilers. He also was a member of the Montreal Alouettes in the Canadian Football League. He played college football at Southern University.

Early years
Davis attended Wheatley High School, where he practiced track and field, playing organized football only as a senior. He accepted a track and field scholarship from Southern University to run hurdles. He also played four years on the football team as a wingback.

Professional career

Dallas Cowboys
Davis was selected by the Dallas Cowboys in the sixth round (74th overall) of the 1962 NFL Draft. He appeared in 11 games as a backup wide receiver. He was waived in 1963.

Grand Rapids Blazers (UFL)
In 1964, he played with the Grand Rapids Blazers of the United Football League.

Green Bay Packers
In 1965, he was signed by the Green Bay Packers. He was tried at defensive back and was released on August 29.

Montreal Alouettes
On September 8, 1965, he signed with the Montreal Alouettes of the Canadian Football League. In 1967, he was the team's leading receiver with 31 catches for 656 yards and a 21.2-yard per catch average. On August 25, 1969, he was cut with a broken wrist.

Houston Oilers
In 1970, he was signed as a free agent by the Houston Oilers. He appeared in 14 games as a backup tight end. He was released on September 9, 1971.

Houston Texans / Shreveport Steamer
In 1974, he signed with the Houston Texans of the World Football League. The team relocated to Shreveport on September 18, and were rechristened the Shreveport Steamer. He finished the season with 18 receptions for 280 yards. Davis returned the next year, posting 9 receptions for 144 yards and one touchdown. He finished his career when the league folded on October 22, 1975.

Personal life
On January 19, 2004, he died after a lengthy battle with cancer.

References

External links
CFL bio
Just Sports Stats

1940 births
2004 deaths
Players of American football from Houston
Players of Canadian football from Houston
American football wide receivers
Southern Jaguars football players
Dallas Cowboys players
Montreal Alouettes players
Houston Oilers players
Houston Texans (WFL) players
Shreveport Steamer players
United Football League (1961–1964) players